The men's 4 × 100 metres relay event at the 2003 All-Africa Games was held on October 14–15.

Medalists

Results

Heats
Qualification: First 3 teams of each heat (Q) plus the next 2 fastest (q) qualified for the final.

Final

References
Results
Results

4 x 100